Ernst Gustaf Casparsson (15 November 1886 – 7 September 1973) was a Swedish equestrian who competed in the 1912 Summer Olympics. He and his horse Irmelin finished fifth in the individual eventing competition and won a gold medal with the Swedish eventing team. He also finished sixth in the individual jumping event on the horse Kiriki.

Casparsson was born in a family of seven siblings and grew up on his father's farm in Kolmården. One of his brothers, Otto, became a prominent actor, and sister Elsa was an artist. In 1921 Casparsson purchased the farm, which by then was in a financial trouble, and managed to repay its debt by working both as a farmer and a military officer. In 1924 he married a woman 14 years his junior; the couple had four boys.

References

1886 births
1973 deaths
Swedish event riders
Swedish show jumping riders
Olympic equestrians of Sweden
Swedish male equestrians
Equestrians at the 1912 Summer Olympics
Olympic gold medalists for Sweden
Olympic medalists in equestrian
Medalists at the 1912 Summer Olympics
Swedish Army officers
People from Norrköping Municipality
Sportspeople from Östergötland County
19th-century Swedish people
20th-century Swedish people